In category theory, a finitely generated object is the quotient of a free object over a finite set, in the sense that it is the target of a regular epimorphism from a free object that is free on a finite set.

For instance, one way of defining a finitely generated group is that it is the image of a group homomorphism from a finitely generated free group.

See also
Finitely generated (disambiguation)

References

Category theory